Karl Henrik Borch (13 March 1919 – 2 December 1986)  was a professor at NHH in Bergen, Norway between 1963 and 1986. He is considered one of the founders of economics of uncertainty, counting 150 scientific articles in journals and conference proceedings, and three books.

References

External links

"Karl Borch: A driving force behind the expansion of research at NHH"

Academic staff of the Norwegian School of Economics
1919 births
1986 deaths
20th-century Norwegian economists
Fellows of the Econometric Society